The 1983 Northwest Territories general election was held on November 21, 1983.

This was the first election in the Northwest Territories with live television coverage of vote returns.

Election Results

The election was held in 24 constituencies, up two from the previous general election in 1979, with 15,764 ballot cast, a turnout of 69.72%.

Outgoing Premier George Braden did not run for re-election. Richard Nerysoo was chosen as Premier January 12th, 1984, serving over a year until November 5, 1985; Nick Sibbeston was designated Premier following his resignation.

Election summary

Candidates

* - denotes an incumbent running in a new district

References

Northwest Territories
Elections in the Northwest Territories
Northwest Territories general election
General election